The Panao antpitta (Grallaria oneilli) is a species of bird in the family Grallariidae. It is endemic to Peru. It is a member of the rufous antpitta species complex and was formally described in 2020 by R. Terry Chesser and Morton L. Isler.

Taxonomy 
The Panao antpitta was described as a species on the basis of differences in plumage, vocalizations and genetics. It forms a sister group with the Chachapoyas antpitta and the Junín antpitta. The birds in the Panao antpitta's range were formerly believed to be part of subspecies G. rufula obscura (now elevated to the Junín antpitta, G. obscura).

The Panao antpitta's specific name, oneilli, are named for Dr. John P. O'Neill, the ornithologist who collected the type specimen in Huánaco in 1983.

Distribution and habitat 
The Panao antpitta is endemic to the eastern slope of the Peruvian Andes in the departments of Huánaco and Pasco. They inhabit humid montane forests and are usually found in the understory or forest floor.

They are separated from the closely related Chachapoyas antpitta by the Huallaga river to the north of their range. In the south, they are separated from the also closely related Junín antpitta by the Perené and Paucartambo rivers.

References 

Endemic fauna of Peru
Birds of Peru
Grallaria